Stauning is a village with a population of 364 (1 January 2022). It is situated in Western Jutland, Denmark, at the easthern shore of Ringkøbing Fjord, 8 km west of the town of Skjern.  

Stauning Vestjylland Airport is located 4 km northwest of Stauning.

The whisky distillery Stauning Whisky is located just south of the village.

References 

Cities and towns in the Central Denmark Region
Villages in Denmark